William Ralph Cartwright (30 March 1771 – 4 January 1847) was an English landowner and  Tory politician who sat in the House of Commons between 1797 and 1846.

Life
Cartwright was the son of Thomas Cartwright of Aynhoe Park and his wife Mary Catherine Desaguilliers.  In 1793 a highwayman was transported for robbing him of £32 10s worth of goods and money.

In 1797 on the retirement of Thomas Powys, he was elected Member of Parliament for Northamptonshire. He held the seat until 1831. In the 1832 general election he was elected MP for South Northamptonshire and held the seat until he resigned in 1846.

Cartwright was lieutenant-colonel in the local militia during the Napoleonic wars, and was responsible for the  Brackley Battalion.  In the time of agricultural depression and increasing population, Cartwright helped settle many dozens of his surplus agricultural labourers in Wellington County, Ontario from the late 1820s until his death. He ran up huge debts, mainly from playing the stock market, which he did unsuccessfully.

Family
Cartwright married Hon. Emma Mary Maude daughter of Viscount Hawarden on 12 April 1794. They had children Thomas who became a diplomat and William who became a lieutenant general. These had respectively sons William Cornwallis Cartwright and Fairfax Cartwright who were both MPs. Cartwright's wife died in 1808 and he married again on 29 May 1810 to Julia Frances Aubrey, with whom he had five children including Henry Cartwright.

References

External links 
 
Portrait

 

1771 births
1847 deaths
Members of the Parliament of Great Britain for English constituencies
Members of the Parliament of the United Kingdom for English constituencies
British MPs 1796–1800
UK MPs 1801–1802
UK MPs 1802–1806
UK MPs 1806–1807
UK MPs 1807–1812
UK MPs 1820–1826
UK MPs 1826–1830
UK MPs 1830–1831
UK MPs 1832–1835
UK MPs 1835–1837
UK MPs 1837–1841
UK MPs 1841–1847
English landowners
People from Aynho